The Tempest (1911) is an American one-reel silent film adaptation of the William Shakespeare play The Tempest. It was directed by Edwin Thanhouser, and starred Ed Genung as Ferdinand and Florence La Badie as Miranda, and released by Thanhouser Film Corporation. One of the earliest film adaptations of the play, it was released on November 28, 1911.

See also
The Tempest (1908 film)
The Tempest (1963 film)
The Tempest (1979 film)
Tempest (1982 film)
The Tempest (2010 film)
List of William Shakespeare film adaptations

References
The Tempest (1911) at IMDB

  

1911 films
American silent short films
Films based on The Tempest
1911 drama films
American black-and-white films
Films set on islands
1911 short films
Silent American drama films
1910s American films